Toon Studio is a land at Walt Disney Studios Park in Disneyland Paris, France.

The land, formerly known as Animation Courtyard, received a revamp in 2007 to features a more colourful and "immersive," theming. In August of 2021, much of the land's Pixar attractions were rebranded under a new sub-area referred to as Worlds of Pixar.

Developed by Walt Disney Imagineering, the new land was announced on January 11, 2005 by  Euro Disney SCA, the owner and operator of Disneyland Resort Paris, as part of a new initiative to add new attractions to both theme parks made possible by a major financial restructuring. The new creative director for Walt Disney Imagineering, John Lasseter, has made it clear he is reviewing all concepts for attractions that have been definitely commissioned, and in particular the Toon Studio is an area he wants to expand upon.

The Toon Studio concept is a spin-off of the Mickey's Toontown idea.  Mickey's Toontown is an area currently at two other Disney theme parks where guests can experience the living environments of Disney characters, whereas the Walt Disney Studios is being publicised as where the Disney characters go to work, producing their animated films themselves using conventional movie-making equipment.

Attractions and entertainment

Current
 Animation Celebration
 Flying Carpets Over Agrabah — a spinner ride similar to Dumbo the Flying Elephant where riders sit in magic carpets and act as extras in Genie’s directorial debut. The attraction is set against a large “movie set” backdrop of Agrabah.

Worlds of Pixar area 
Crush's Coaster — a spinning roller coaster where guests enter the beached sound stage and film set of Finding Nemo, where Crush invites them to climb aboard sea turtle shells for a ride through memorable scenes from the movie. This is a unique attraction to Walt Disney Studios Park.
Cars Quatre Roues Rallye — a Zamperla Demolition Derby attraction where guests are spin at a Radiator Spring’s car service station. Their cars are located on four spinning plateaus and they change from one spinning plateau to the next.
Cars Road Trip
Ratatouille: L'Aventure Totalement Toquée de Rémy
Monsters Inc. Scream Academy
 Mickey and the Magician — a live show based on Disney animated films.
 Toy Story Playland 
RC Racer
Slinky Dog Zigzag Spin 
Toy Soldiers Parachute Drop

Former
 Animagique (2002-2016)
Art of Disney Animation (2002-2019)

Restaurants
 Toon Studio Catering Co.
 Jessie's Snack Roundup
 Bistrot Chez Rémy

Shops
 The Disney Animation Gallery
 Animagique Kiosk
 Chez Marianne, Souvenirs de Paris

References

External links
 Disneyland Paris's official website - Toy Story Playland is part of Toon Studio

Themed areas in Walt Disney Parks and Resorts
Walt Disney Studios Park